Mpofana Local Municipality is an administrative area in the UMgungundlovu District of KwaZulu-Natal in South Africa.

Main places
The 2001 census divided the municipality into the following main places:

Politics 

The municipal council consists of ten members elected by mixed-member proportional representation. Five councillors are elected by first-past-the-post voting in five wards, while the remaining five are chosen from party lists so that the total number of party representatives is proportional to the number of votes received. In the election of 1 November 2021 the African National Congress (ANC) won a majority of seven seats on the council.
The following table shows the results of the election.

References

External links 
 https://web.archive.org/web/20120518060135/http://mpofana.local.gov.za/

Local municipalities of the Umgungundlovu District Municipality